Parels (English: Pearls) is a debut album of the Belgian girlgroup K3. It was released on 4 October 1999 through the Capetown/Wivani label. The album reached the 2nd position in the Flemish albums chart.

Track listing

Chart performance

Weekly charts

Year-end charts

Certifications

Parels 2000
On 28 September 2000 a reissue of the album was released through label Niels William, called Parels 2000. This album also charted in The Netherlands. Parels 2000 contains all the original songs as listed above, with an extra CD containing remixes and karaoke versions of the original songs. The remix of "Op elkaar", called "Op elkaar (remix 2000)" was released as fifth single from the album.

Track listing

Chart performance

Weekly charts

Year-end charts

2008 reissue
On August 11, 2008, another reissue of the album was released. This version of Parels contains two CDs, with on the first one the original songs as listed above, and on the second one karaoke versions of all the songs.

Track listing

References

1999 albums
K3 (band) albums